Verl A. "Jiggs" Westergard (November 19, 1921 – October 4, 2001) was an American football, basketball, and baseball player and coach. He served the head men's basketball coach at his alma mater, Gustavus Adolphus College in St. Peter, Minnesota in 1949. He later served as a line coach at Upsala College in East Orange, New Jersey and as a football, basketball and golf coach at Texas Lutheran University in Seguin, Texas until his retirement.

Head coaching record

Football

References

External links

1921 births
2001 deaths
Baseball pitchers
Gustavus Adolphus Golden Gusties baseball coaches
Gustavus Adolphus Golden Gusties football coaches
Gustavus Adolphus Golden Gusties football players
Gustavus Adolphus Golden Gusties men's basketball coaches
Superior Bays players
Texas Lutheran Bulldogs football coaches
Texas Lutheran Bulldogs men's basketball coaches
Upsala Vikings football coaches
Waterloo White Hawks players
College golf coaches in the United States
High school football coaches in Minnesota
People from Stearns County, Minnesota
Players of American football from Minnesota
Baseball players from Minnesota
Basketball coaches from Minnesota